The Headbangers Ball Tour was a North American tour presented by MTV's Headbangers Ball, which took place in April and May 1989. It was headlined by American thrash metal band Anthrax, and supported by Exodus and Helloween.

History
The tour began on April 3, 1989 in Seattle, and ended on May 12, 1989 in Poughkeepsie. Anthrax was promoting their platinum-selling album State of Euphoria, while Exodus and Helloween were promoting their respective albums Fabulous Disaster and Keeper of the Seven Keys, Pt. 2.

The Headbangers Ball Tour is notable for being Exodus' last tour with drummer Tom Hunting, until he rejoined the band in 1997. Due to health problems, Hunting left the band in the middle of the tour and was temporarily replaced by Vio-lence drummer Perry Strickland and then permanently by John Tempesta, who was a drum tech for Anthrax and would remain in Exodus until their breakup in 1993.

MTV and Island Records paired up for a Headbangers Ball Tour contest.  The winner was Lori Gutman who lived in Kinnelon, NJ.  Members of Anthrax and Exodus taped a spot for Headbangers Ball at the winner's home.  It aired later that year.  The grand prize was a 1989 Jeep Wrangler, $1,000, and some Headbangers Ball swag.

Tour dates

Personnel
Anthrax:
 Joey Belladonna – vocals
 Dan Spitz – lead guitar
 Scott Ian – rhythm guitar
 Frank Bello – bass
 Charlie Benante – drums

Exodus:
 Steve "Zetro" Souza – vocals
 Gary Holt – guitars
 Rick Hunolt – guitars
 Rob McKillop – bass
 Tom Hunting – drums (April 3–10 shows)
 Perry Strickland – drums (filling in for Hunting on select dates)
 John Tempesta – drums (filling in for Hunting on select dates)

Helloween:
 Michael Kiske – vocals
 Michael Weikath – lead guitar
 Roland Grapow – rhythm guitar
 Markus Grosskopf – bass
 Ingo Schwichtenberg – drums

References

1989 concert tours
Anthrax (American band) concert tours
Exodus (American band) concert tours
Helloween concert tours
Heavy metal concerts